The Corniche Beirut is a seaside promenade in the Central District of Beirut, Lebanon. Lined with palm trees, the waterfront esplanade has views of the Mediterranean and the summits of Mount Lebanon to the east.  Corniche Beirut has its foundation in the Avenue des Français, which was built during the period of the Mandate for Syria and the Lebanon along the seafront that extended from the old town.

Location

Usage 
The Corniche is a common destination for walkers, joggers and bikers. Push cart vendors offer various local snacks and drinks. A number of the trunks of the palm trees that line the Corniche are pockmarked with bullet holes from the Lebanese Civil War. Several hotels, such as Le Vendôme Intercontinental Hotel and Phoenicia InterContinental Hotel overlook the Corniche.

Modernization 
In 2001, the 76 cement benches were replaced with new ones covered with colorful cut ceramics that were designed by Lebanese artist Lena Kelekian, who also designed a Mega Chessboard on the widest section of the sidewalk on Avenue de Paris. In the summer of 2007, the distinctive blue railings were replaced, due to severe rusting, with an aluminum railing that has been modified to make it more difficult for thrill-seekers to dive off the railings.

Gallery

References

External links 
 

Streets in Beirut
Beirut Corniche
Tourist attractions in Beirut